Chinese desserts are sweet foods and dishes that are served with tea, along with meals or at the end of meals in Chinese cuisine. The desserts encompass a wide variety of ingredients commonly used in East Asian cuisines such as powdered or whole glutinous rice, sweet bean pastes, and agar. Due to the many Chinese cultures and the long history of China, there are a great variety of desserts of many forms.

Chinese desserts

A

 Annin tofu
 Aiwowo

B
 Banana roll
 Black sesame roll
 Black sesame soup
 Bingfen

C

 Chao hong guo 
 Chongyang cake — 9 September of each Chinese lunar calendar  
 Coconut bar 
 Crystal cake 
 Custard tart

D
 Douhua 
 Dragon's beard candy
 Double skin milk

E

 Egg tart 
 Egg tong sui 
 Eggies
 Eight treasure congee

F

 Fried ice cream 
 Funing big cake
 Fried milk

G
 Ginger milk curd 
 Grass jelly 
 Guilinggao

H

 Hasma
 Huangqiao sesame cake

J
 Jiuniang
 JingBaJian
 Jian dui

K
 Kai kou xiao

L
 Ligao Tang
 Lotus seed paste

M

 Mahua 
 Mango pudding 
 Malay sponge cake
 Mi san dao
 Mooncake

N

 Nai lao 
 Nian gao 
 Nuomici

O
 Osmanthus cake

P
 Put chai ko
 Pineapple bun

R
 Red bean cake 
 Red bean soup 
 Red tortoise cake
 Rice pudding
 Red bean bun

S
 Sachima 
 Song gao 
 Sugar painting 
 Sweet potato soup 
 Sweetheart cake

T
 Tanghulu 
 Tangyuan 
 Tapioca pudding 
 Taro purée
 Tong sui

W
 White sugar sponge cake

X
 Xi gua lao

Z
 Zongzi

See also

 Chinese bakery products
 Cuisine
 List of desserts
 List of Chinese dishes
 List of Chinese sauces
 List of Chinese soups
 List of restaurants in China

References

External links 

Chinese
Desserts